Philipp I of Katzenelnbogen (1402–1479), also known "Philipp the Elder" was Count of Katzenelnbogen from 1444 to 1479 and was the last male descendant of the Counts of Katzenelnbogen (his two sons died before him).  His parents were Johann IV, Count of Katzenelnbogen (younger line) and Anne of Katzenelnbogen (older line), who merged the two lines of the family back together in 1402.

Marriage and issue 
Philip married on 24 February 1422 in Darmstadt Anna of Württemberg (1408–1471), daughter of Eberhard IV "the Younger" of Württemberg.  In 1456, he obtained from the Pope a divorce a mensa et thoro.  In 1474 Philip married Anne of Nassau-Siegen.

Philipp had three children with his first wife:
 Philipp the Younger (* 1427; † 27 February 1453), married in 1450 Ottilie of Nassau-Siegen, daughter of Henry II, Count of Nassau-Siegen. In 1453 they had a daughter Ottilie of Katzenelnbogen.
 Eberhard (* 1437; † 1456), canon of Cologne, was stabbed in Bruges (Flanders).
 Anna (* 5 September 1443; † 16 February 1494), married in 1458 margrave Henry III of Hesse (15 October 1441 — 13 January 1483).  In 1471, they had a son William III, who was the last male descendant of this line of the House of Hesse.

Legacy 
 In 1444 Philipp initiated a major renovation of the collegiate church of Sankt Goar.
 In 1449 he bought off the rights on St. Goar held by abbot Johann of the Abbey at Prüm.
 In 1470 he handed Upper Katzenelnbogen and its seat Darmstadt to his son-in-law Henry III, Landgrave of Upper Hesse.

Philipp's sons Eberhard and Philipp the younger died before his death, so when Philipp died in 1479, the Katzenelnbogen family died out in the male line.  The County of Katzenelnbogen fell to the Landgraviate of Hesse, which was ruled at the time by Philipp's son-in-law Henry III of Hesse in Marburg, Henry having bought off the inheritance rights of Philipp's granddaughter Ottilie.

Ancestry

References

External links 
 Count Philipp I of Katzenelnbogen
 History of the Counts of Katzenelnbogen

1402 births
1479 deaths
Counts of Katzenelnbogen
15th-century German people